Love Inspired is an imprint of Harlequin Enterprises that is focused on Christian Fiction.

The original and largest body of works under the "Love Inspired" name is the romance novels. Love Inspired Suspense and Love Inspired Historical represent a branching of the romance genre to a more particular theme and setting. A number of books have been released as Love Inspired Special releases sometimes containing the listing of Love Inspired Classics or going under different brands. In total more than 762 books comprise the Love Inspired brand.

The first release of Love Inspired was The Perfect Couple by Valerie Hansen in November 2000, with the second book being Tested by Fire by Kathryn Springer in August 2004. Books have been released monthly since, with the Love Inspired Suspense line of books beginning in July 2005 with Note of Peril by Hannah Alexander and Love Inspired Historical beginning in February 2008 with The Briton by Catherine Palmer. A collection of Love Inspired Special releases, including bearing the name Love Inspired Classics or other brandings have been used; with the first publication being Hearts Evergreen containing the work of Robin Lee Hatcher and Kathryn Springer.

Focus 
Love Inspired books are romances that are strongly rooted in traditional Christian and moral values. Publications include faith elements, have no graphic violence, premarital sex, or romances based on emotional over sexual desires. Harlequin's website states that Love Inspired is likened to Touched by an Angel, Seventh Heaven, or Gilmore Girls in terms of content.

List of Love Inspired books

Imprints

References

External links 
 

Harlequin Enterprises
Book publishing companies of Canada